Igor Vujić (born 28 September 1987) is a Croatian handball player who plays for PPD Zagreb. 

In March 2013 Vujić was invited to play for the national team of Croatia by head coach Slavko Goluža.

Personal life
Vujić speaks Croatian, Slovenian, English, French and Italian.

Honours
Zamet
Croatian Cup
Finalist (1): 2012

NEXE
Dukat Premier League
Runner-up (2): 2012-13, 2013-14

Sélestat
LNH Division 2 
Promotion (1): 2015-16

References

External links
European Stats
League and Cup stats

1987 births
Living people
RK Zagreb players
RK Zamet players
Croatian male handball players
Sportspeople from Koper